Grootdraai is a town and a mine in Capricorn District Municipality in the Limpopo province of South Africa.

References

Populated places in the Blouberg Local Municipality